Patricia A. Brieschke is an American short story writer.

Life
She graduated from Northeastern Illinois University, Alfred Adler Institute with an MA, in 1979, and from University of Illinois at Chicago with a Ph.D., in 1983. 
She teaches at Hofstra University. 
Her work has been published in Appalachee Review, Karamu, The Rambler Magazine, The MacGuffin, PMS, Rainbow Curve, Sou'wester, and StoryQuarterly.

She lives in Waccabuc, New York.

Awards
 2008 Dana Award

Works
"Cracking Open", New Millennium Writings, NMW Awards 23
"All Of Me", The Sun Magazine, March 2009, issue 399

Anthologies

References

External links
"The Best American Essays 2008"

American women short story writers
Northeastern Illinois University alumni
University of Illinois Chicago alumni
Hofstra University faculty
Living people
People from Waccabuc, New York
20th-century American short story writers
21st-century American short story writers
20th-century American women writers
21st-century American women writers
Writers from New York (state)
Year of birth missing (living people)
American women academics